Numerov's method (also called  Cowell's method) is a numerical method to solve ordinary differential equations of second order in which the first-order term does not appear. It is a fourth-order linear multistep method. The method is implicit, but can be made explicit if the differential equation is linear.

Numerov's method was developed by the Russian astronomer Boris Vasil'evich Numerov.

The method
The Numerov method can be used to solve differential equations of the form

In it, three values of  taken at three equidistant points  are related as follows:

Nonlinear equations 

For nonlinear equations of the form

the method gives

It achieves order-4 accuracy .

Application

In numerical physics the method is used to find solutions of the unidimensional Schrödinger equation for arbitrary potentials. An example of which is solving the radial equation for a spherically symmetric potential. In this example, after separating the variables and analytically solving the angular equation, we are left with the following equation of the radial function :

This equation can be reduced to the form necessary for the application of Numerov's method with the following substitution:

And when we make the substitution, the radial equation becomes

or

which is equivalent to the one-dimensional Schrödinger equation, but with the modified effective potential

This equation we can proceed to solve the same way we would have solved the one-dimensional Schrödinger equation. We can rewrite the equation a little bit differently and thus see the possible application of Numerov's method more clearly:

Derivation
We are given the differential equation

To derive the Numerov's method for solving this equation, we begin with the Taylor expansion of the function we want to solve, around the point :

If we evenly discretize the space, we get a grid of  points, where .

Computationally, this amounts to taking a step forward by an amount .

Note that only the odd powers of  experienced a sign change. By summing the two equations, we derive that

To get an expression for the  factor, we simply have to differentiate  twice and approximate it again in the same way we did this above:

If we now substitute this to the preceding equation, we get

or

This yields the Numerov's method if we ignore the term of order . It follows that the order of convergence (assuming stability) is 4.

References 
 .  This book includes the following references:
 .
 .

Numerical differential equations